Acetatifactor muris  is a bacterium from the genus of Acetatifactor which was isolated from the cecal content of an obese mouse in Freising-Weihenstephan in Germany. The organism is rod-shaped, Gram-positive, anaerobic, and non-motile. The organism does not form spores, and its GC-content is 48%. It does not metabolize glucose, and it tests positive for phenylalanine arylamidase. This species is the type strain for the genus Acetatifactor, which is commonly found in the guts of rodents. The DSM type strain is 23669T, and the ATCC type strain is BAA-2170T.

References

External links
Type strain of Acetatifactor muris at BacDive -  the Bacterial Diversity Metadatabase	

Lachnospiraceae
Bacteria described in 2013